, often credited as Naoki Bandou, is a Japanese voice actor who has worked on a few videogame titles and anime series. He provides the voice of Lord Emon in Shadow of the Colossus, and the voice of Larikush in Baten Kaitos.  Some of his anime voiceovers include the role of Gatō in Naruto. He is the voice of Splatter in the Japanese version of the film Thomas and the Magic Railroad.

Filmography

Television animation
 Hikaru no Go (2001) - Shinoda Insei Instructor (ep 63)
 Rockman EXE Beast (2005) - Zoano DarkMan
 One Punch Man (2019) - Elder Centipede

Unknown date
 Armored Trooper VOTOMS: The Heretic Saint - Elder C (ep 3); Officer (ep 5); Pope Theo VIII
 Bakumatsu Kikansetsu Irohanihoheto - Hata Meifuu (eps 5-8); Tatsugorou Shinmon (eps 6, 9-14)
 Battle Spirits: Brave - Elder
 Battle Spirits: Shōnen Gekiha Dan - Old Otherworld King (ep 26)
 Berserk - Owen
 Betterman - Officer
 The Brave Fighter of Sun Fighbird - Guard Star, Guardion
 The Brave of Gold Goldran - Jet Silver, Star Silver, Drill Silver, Fire Silver, Silverion, God Silverion
 The Bush Baby - Kankari
 Chimera - Angel of Death - Hitman
 City Hunter: Bay City Wars - Soldier A
 Code Geass: Lelouch of the Rebellion - Izumi
 Crayon Shin-chan - 20-year-old D (ep 173); Junichi Ishizaka
 D.Gray-man - Alphonse Claus (ep 45)
 Daa! Daa! Daa! - Principal
 Detective Conan - Masaharu Motoyama (eps 371-372)
 The Five Star Stories - Man E
 Gokudo - King
 Gunslinger Girl: Il Teatrino - Inspector Moro (ep 4)
 Hakkenden: Legend of the Dog Warriors - Yoshinari Satome (ep 11)
 Hyper Police - lizard A (ep 5); Mudagami
 Ki*Me*Ra - Soldier
 Kobato. - Addition voice(ep 5)
 Kodocha - Maeda-san
 Lupin III: The Columbus Files (special) - Doctor A
 Madlax - Nayman
 Magic User's Club - TV Broadcaster
 Mao-chan - Tokusaburo Tokugawa
 Matchless Raijin-Oh - Heavy Metal Man (ep 33)
 Miracle Girls - Yoshimura-sensei (ep 11)
 Mobile Suit Victory Gundam - Fusark; Otis Arkins
 Monster - Janáček
 Moonlight Mile - Noguchi (eps 9-11)
 Mujin Wakusei Survive - Tako
 Naruto - Gatoo; Toubei Kagetsu (ep 186)
 Nightwalker - Director (ep 2); Doctor (ep 3); Furano (ep 4)
 Nurse Angel Ririka SOS - Announcer (ep 30); Dark Joker (ep 34); Hiroshi Uzaki
 Photon: The Idiot Adventures - Bandit 1
 Pom Poko - Male tanuki A
 Rockman.EXE Beast - Zoan Darkman
 Shugo Chara! - Kōtarō Himeno (ep 49)
 Slayers - Examiner A (ep 16)
 The Story of Saiunkoku - Enjun Sa-taiho; Young Enjun Sa
 Sword for Truth - Officer A
 Ultra Nyan 2: Happy Daisakusen - Goemon
 Urayasu Tekkin Kazoku - Kintetsu Oosawagi; Toragorou Ushimatsu
 Warau Salesman - Additional voice(s)
 Witch Hunter Robin - Institute Head
 Yawara! A Fashionable Judo Girl - Fujiko's Father
 Yomigaeru Sora - Rescue Wings - Hirofumi Morimoto (eps 8-9)
 Zipang - Matome Ugaki

Original video animation (OVA)
 Mobile Suit Gundam: The Origin (2016) - Torenov Y. Minovsky

Animated films
 Crayon Shin-chan: Action Kamen vs Leotard Devil (xxxx) - Staff
 Crayon Shin-chan: The Secret Treasure of Buri Buri Kingdom (xxxx) - Guard
 Crayon Shin-chan: Adventure in Henderland (xxxx) - TV Caster
 Yo-kai Watch: Enma Daiō to Itsutsu no Monogatari da Nyan! (2016)

Tokusatsu
 Ninpuu Sentai Hurricanger (xxxx) (Disaster Ninja Kangaroulette)

Video games
 Ace Combat 5: The Unsung War PS2 (xxxx) - Additional Voices
 Baten Kaitos: Eternal Wings and the Lost Ocean GameCube (xxxx) - Larikush
 Rockman DASH: Hagane no Boukenshin Nintendo 64, PC, PS, PSP - Police Inspector, Officer, Wily
 Skylanders: Giants PS3, Wii Wii U, Xbox 360 (xxxx) - Arkeyan Conquertron, Arkeyan King
 Bloody Roar 4 PS2 (xxxx) - Long the Tiger
 Shadow of the Colossus PS2, PS3 (xxxx) - Lord Emon
 Lego Island (1997) - Captain D. Rom
 Okage: Shadow King PS2 (2001) - Narrator

Drama CDs
 Happy Time (xxxx) (Saegusa)
 Ishiguro Kazuomi shi no, Sasayaka na Tanoshimi (xxxx) (Mitamura)

Dubbing roles

Live-action
 Airheads – Pip (Adam Sandler)
 Bottoms Up – Uncle Earl Peadman (David Keith)
 Christopher Robin – Giles Winslow Jr. (Mark Gatiss)
 Downfall – Hans Krebs (Rolf Kanies)
 Dreamcatcher – Joe "Beaver" Clarendon (Jason Lee)
 The Family Man – Arnie (Jeremy Piven)
 Gossip Girl – Roman (William Abadie)
 Joey – Zach Miller (Miguel A. Núñez Jr.)
 Kung Fu Hustle – Donut
 The Matrix – Tank (Marcus Chong)
 The Motorcycle Diaries – Alberto Granado (Rodrigo de la Serna)
 New York Minute – Maxamillion "Max" Lomax (Eugene Levy)
 Screamers – Private Ross (Charles Powell)
 Serendipity – Dean Kansky (Jeremy Piven)
 Space Jam – Muggsy Bogues
 A Star Is Born – Carl (Ron Rifkin)
 Star Trek: The Motion Picture – Hikaru Sulu (George Takei)
 Storm Catcher – Captain "Sparks" Johnson (Mystro Clark)
 The Take – Marco Ruiz (Yul Vazquez)
 They Found Hell – Dr. Maro
 Tomorrowland – Science Teacher (David Nykl)

Animation
 Batman: The Brave and the Bold – Doctor Sivana
 Exchange Student Zero – Principal Rogerson
 Thomas and the Magic Railroad – Splatter

References

External links
 

1957 births
Living people
Japanese male voice actors
People from Asahikawa